The ocellated crake (Micropygia schomburgkii) is a species of bird in the family Rallidae that is placed in the monotypic genus Micropygia.
It is found in Bolivia, Brazil, Colombia, Costa Rica, French Guiana, Guyana, Paraguay, Peru, Suriname, Venezuela and recently, a small population was found in Argentina.
Its natural habitats are dry savanna and subtropical or tropical seasonally wet or flooded lowland grassland.

References

ocellated crake
Birds of Brazil
Birds of the Bolivian Amazon
Birds of the Guianas
Birds of the Colombian Amazon
Birds of the Venezuelan Coastal Range
ocellated crake
Taxonomy articles created by Polbot